Darrell D. Williams Jr. (born March 24, 1993) is an American football offensive tackle who is a free agent. He played college football at Western Kentucky.

Early years
Williams attended West Laurens High School in Dexter, Georgia, where he  lettered in football and basketball.

College career
Williams played in 46 games for the Western Kentucky Hilltoppers.

Professional career

San Francisco 49ers
After going undrafted in the 2017 NFL Draft, Williams signed with the San Francisco 49ers as an undrafted free agent on May 4, 2017. He was waived by the 49ers on September 2, 2017 and was signed to the practice squad the next day. On November 4, Williams was promoted to the active roster.

On August 31, 2018, Williams was waived by the 49ers.

Los Angeles Rams
On September 18, 2018, Johnson was signed to the Los Angeles Rams' practice squad. He signed a reserve/future contract with the Rams on February 7, 2019. On May 1, 2019, the Rams waived Williams.

Baltimore Ravens
On May 6, 2019, Williams signed with the Baltimore Ravens. He was waived during final roster cuts on August 30, 2019.

Ottawa Redblacks
Williams signed with the Ottawa Redblacks on February 10, 2020. He was released on June 21, 2021.

References

External links
San Francisco 49ers bio
Western Kentucky Hilltoppers bio

1993 births
Living people
Players of American football from Georgia (U.S. state)
People from Dublin, Georgia
American football offensive tackles
Western Kentucky Hilltoppers football players
San Francisco 49ers players
Los Angeles Rams players
Baltimore Ravens players
Ottawa Redblacks players